The G- and H-class destroyers were a group of 18 destroyers built for the Royal Navy during the 1930s. Six additional ships being built for the Brazilian Navy when World War II began in 1939 were purchased by the British and named the Havant class. The design was a major export success with other ships built for the Argentine and Royal Hellenic Navies. They were assigned to the Mediterranean Fleet upon completion and enforced the Non-Intervention Agreement during the Spanish Civil War of 1936–1939.

Most ships were recalled home or were sent to the North Atlantic from October–November 1939, after it became clear that Fascist Italy was not going to intervene in World War II. Then they began to escort convoys and patrol for German submarines and commerce raiders. Two ships were lost to German mines in the first six months of the war. Three more were lost during the Norwegian Campaign, one in combat with a German cruiser and two during the First Battle of Narvik in April 1940. The Battle of France was the next test for the destroyers from May–June, with many of the Gs and Havants participating in the evacuation of Dunkirk and the subsequent evacuations of Allied troops from western France. Three ships were sunk, two by bombs and the other to torpedoes. Most of the H-class ships were sent to the Mediterranean in May in case Mussolini decided to attack France and the majority of the surviving Gs were sent to Force H at Gibraltar in July. By the end of the year, the ships participated in several battles with the Royal Italian Navy, losing two to Italian mines and torpedoes, while sinking two Italian submarines. The Havants spent most of the war in the North Atlantic on convoy escort duties, losing half their number to German submarines, while helping to sink six in exchange by the end of the war.

The G- and H-class ships of the Mediterranean Fleet escorted numerous Malta convoys, participated in the Battle of Cape Matapan in March 1941 and covered the evacuation of troops from Greece and Crete from May–June, losing two to German bombers and another so badly damaged that she was later written off. By the end of the year, they had sunk three submarines, two Italian and one German. Three Hs participated in the Second Battle of Sirte in March 1942, during which one was damaged. Further damaged by aerial attacks, she was ordered to Gibraltar and ran aground in transit and had to be destroyed. Another was torpedoed and lost during Operation Vigorous in June. The ships sank two more submarines during 1942 and three destroyers began conversion to escort destroyers late that year and early in 1943. Two of the four surviving Gs and Hs were transferred to the Royal Canadian Navy (RCN) while under conversion. All of the surviving ships joined their Havant half-sisters on escort duty in the North Atlantic in 1943.

One ship was sent to the Mediterranean in 1944 while three others were transferred to the UK in preparation for Operation Overlord. Between them they sank five German submarines in 1944 with another in 1945. Worn-out and obsolete, the survivors were either broken up for scrap or sold off after the war.

Design and description (G and H classes) 
The G class were ordered as part of the 1933 Naval Construction Programme, the H class following in 1934. These ships were based on the preceding F class, but the elimination of cruising turbines and the development of more compact machinery allowed their dimensions and displacement to be slightly reduced. The H class were repeats of the G's with some minor differences. All of the destroyers were fitted with ASDIC (sonar) and the ability to use the Two-Speed Destroyer Sweep (TSDS) minesweeping gear.

Their peacetime complement was 137 officers and ratings, which was intended to increase to 146 in wartime. The ships were at their stability limit as built and the Director of Naval Construction believed that no additions in top weight should be made without an equal amount of weight being removed.

All of the ships had the same main armament, four quick-firing (QF)  Mark IX guns in single mounts, designated 'A', 'B', 'X', and 'Y' from front to rear. The guns had a maximum elevation of 40°; the G class achieved this with a lowered section of the deck around the mount, the "well", that allowed the breech of the gun to be lowered below deck height, but the new gun mount used in the H class was designed to reach that elevation without the necessity for the clumsy "wells". For anti-aircraft (AA) defence, they had two quadruple mounts for the QF 0.5-inch Vickers Mk III machine gun on platforms between the funnels. The G- and H-class ships were fitted with two quadruple mounts for 21-inch (533 mm) torpedo tubes, although  trialled the new quintuple mount. The ships were also equipped with two throwers and one rack for 20 depth charges.

The main guns were controlled by an Admiralty Fire Control Clock Mk I that used data derived from the manually-operated director-control tower and the separate rangefinder situated above the bridge. This was necessary as Hereward was fitted with a prototype twin-gun mounting that had a trunnion height  higher than the previous weapons, therefore it was necessary to raise the wheelhouse to allow the helmsman to see over the top. Raising the wheelhouse meant it had to be placed in front of, rather than underneath, the bridge, and it was given angled sides, resulting in a characteristic wedge shape with a sloping roof.

Wartime modifications
Beginning in May 1940, the after bank of torpedo tubes was removed and replaced with a QF 12-pounder Mk V anti-aircraft gun, the after mast and funnel being cut down to improve the gun's field of fire. Four to eight QF 20 mm Oerlikon cannons were added to the surviving ships, usually replacing the .50-calibre machine gun mounts between the funnels. One pair of these was added to the bridge wings and the other pair was mounted abreast the searchlight platform. Early in the war, depth charge stowage increased to 44. By 1943, only four ships were still afloat and all had the 'Y' gun on the quarterdeck removed to allow for additional depth charge stowage and two additional depth charge throwers. The 12-pounder was removed to allow for the installation of a Huff-Duff radio direction finder on a short mainmast and for more depth charges. All of the survivors, except , had 'A' or 'B' gun replaced by a Hedgehog anti-submarine spigot mortar, and their director-control tower and rangefinder above the bridge removed in exchange for a Type 271 target-indication radar. 'A' gun was later replaced in  while Hero had exchanged 'B' gun for a Hedgehog and a twin-gun mount for QF six-pounder Hotchkiss guns for use against U-boats at very close range. A Type 286 short-range, surface-search radar, adapted from the Royal Air Force's ASV radar, was also added. The early models, however, could only scan directly forward and had to be aimed by turning the entire ship.

Flotilla leaders

As per the E and F class, the flotilla leaders were built to an enlarged design, incorporating a fifth 4.7-inch gun in 'Q' position, between the funnels and were based on the F-class leader, . Grenville was shorter and heavier than Hardy as she used compact Yarrow-type side fired boilers while Hardy was slightly beamier. The ships carried a total of 175 personnel which included the staff of the Captain (D), commanding officer of the flotilla. Their turbines were  more powerful than the private ships, which made them  faster; their propulsion machinery was otherwise identical. Both ships were early wartime losses and consequently received no modifications.

Havant class
The Havants were laid down in 1938 for Brazil and requisitioned on 5 September 1939. They were optimized for anti-submarine work and were completed without 'Y' gun and were equipped with eight throwers and three racks for a total of 110 depth charges. Unlike their half-sisters, they were fitted with a combined rangefinder-director above the bridge. Wartime modifications were similar to the other G- and H-class ships as a 12-pounder AA gun replaced the aft torpedo tubes, 20 mm Oerlikons were added on the bridge wings and a Type 286 radar was installed. Later modifications replaced the .50-calibre machine guns with a pair of Oerlikons, a Type 271 radar was added that replaced the rangefinder-director, a Hedgehog was substituted for 'A' gun, the 12-pounder removed for more depth charge stowage, and a HF/DF mast was installed aft.

Ships

Royal Navy

G class

H class

Havant class
These six ships were ordered by the Brazilian Navy, but on the outbreak of World War II, they were requisitioned by the Royal Navy. They are usually included with the H class.

Argentine Navy
They were built by Vickers Armstrongs (Barrow), Cammell Laird and John Brown & Company (Clydebank). One ship was lost after a collision in 1941, but the remaining ships were in service until broken up in the early 1970s.

Brazilian Navy
Brazil ordered six Jurua-class ships from Britain in 1938. These ships were purchased by Britain on the outbreak of war in 1939 and are described above. The design was based on the H-class plans supplied by Britain, but with guns and machinery supplied by the United States. Although laid down in 1940, the ships were not completed until 1949–1951.

Royal Hellenic Navy
Two ships, modified versions of the G class, were built for the Greek Royal Hellenic Navy (RHN) by Yarrow in the late 1930s. The ships were fitted with German-made  guns and  AA guns. The number of torpedo tubes was reduced by two on these ships to compensate for the additional topweight. The installation of the armament was carried out in Greece as the Germans refused to ship the weapons to Britain. , named after King George I, served with the RHN during the Greco-Italian War. Damaged by German aircraft, the ship managed to reach the Salamis Navy Yard and was put in dry dock for repairs, where after further damage during German air attacks, she was finally scuttled to prevent capture. The Germans raised and repaired her and she was commissioned into the Kriegsmarine as Hermes (ZG3) on 21 March 1942. Hermes was heavily damaged off Cape Bon, Tunisia, on 30 April 1943 and scuttled on 7 May 1943. , named after Queen Olga, served with the RHN during the Greco-Italian War. Along with other ships, she escaped to Alexandria in May 1941 and joined the Allied forces. She was lost to German aircraft while anchored in Lakki Bay, Leros, on 26 September 1943.

Service

Grenville and the G class spent the bulk of their time before the start of World War II assigned to the 1st Destroyer Flotilla (DF) in the Mediterranean Fleet, where they made a number of neutrality patrols during the Spanish Civil War of 1936–1939. With the exception of Garland which was under repair at Malta after a premature explosion of her depth charges, they returned home in October–November after it became clear that the Italians would not enter the war. Hardy and the H-class ships were assigned to the 2nd Destroyer Flotilla and joined the Gs in the Mediterranean after commissioning for similar duties.

After a few weeks assigned to Western Approaches Command, the 1st DF was assigned to the Nore Command at Harwich, although some of the ships were transferred to the 22nd Destroyer Flotilla, where they were tasked for escort and patrol duty. Gipsy was sunk on 21 November after she struck a mine, as did Grenville on 19 January 1940. Unlike the 1st DF, the Second was transferred to Force K in Freetown in West Africa, to help search for German commerce raiders. Some ships were later transferred to Bermuda and the West Indies for escort work and patrolling. They returned to the UK in January and spent several months refitting.

After commissioning, Handy and Hearty were renamed Harvester and Hesperus, respectively, to avoid confusion with Hardy. The Havant-class destroyers initially formed the 9th Destroyer Flotilla assigned to Western Approaches Command for anti-submarine patrols and escort duty. The German invasion of Norway caused Havant, Hesperus, and Havelock to be detached to reinforce the Home Fleet during the Norwegian Campaign.

Garland, Grafton, Gallant, Hasty and Hereward were either under repair or refitting during the early stages of the Norwegian Campaign and did not participate in the Battles of Narvik in April. The remaining ships were assigned to the Home Fleet by this time. Glowworm was separated from the battlecruiser  in a heavy storm on 8 April and encountered the German heavy cruiser  and several destroyers. The British destroyer could not disengage and was sunk after ramming Admiral Hipper. Hardy, Havock, Hostile, Hotspur and Hunter participated in the First Battle of Narvik on 10 April. They sank two German destroyers in exchange for the loss of Hardy and Hunter, while Hotspur was badly damaged. Griffin and Hasty helped to cover the evacuation of Allied troops from Namsos and Åndalsnes at the end of the month. Havelock escorted the transports conducting the evacuation of Narvik in June. Garland was loaned to the Polish Navy in May after her repairs were finished and she remained in the Mediterranean, escorting convoys between Malta and Alexandria, Egypt, until she was transferred to the Western Approaches Command in September.

In mid-May, the 2nd DF was transferred to the Mediterranean with Hostile, Hyperion, Hero, Hereward, Havock, and Hasty assigned. Later that month, many of the remaining G and Havant-class ships participated in Operation Dynamo. Later that day, Grenade blew up after being set on fire by German bombs; three days later, on 1 June, Havant was scuttled after being attacked by German bombers. Gallant and Greyhound were damaged while evacuating troops from Dunkirk. Harvester helped to evacuate more troops from Saint-Valery-en-Caux in Operation Cycle and, together with Griffin, Highlander, and Havelock, she participated in Operation Aerial, the evacuation of Allied troops from Saint-Nazaire and St. Jean de Luz.

Most of the ships of the 2nd DF participated in the inconclusive Battle of Calabria on 7–8 July. Almost two weeks later, Hasty, Hero, Hyperion and Havock were escorting the Australian light cruiser  when they encountered two Italian light cruisers, sinking one of them in the Battle of Cape Spada. Hotspur was assigned to the 13th Destroyer Flotilla, supporting Force H at Gibraltar in July; she was joined by Gallant, Greyhound, and Griffin shortly afterwards. The latter two ships escorted Force H during the Battle of Dakar in September against the Vichy French forces there. Gallant, Greyhound, Griffin, now assigned to the 14th Destroyer Flotilla of the Mediterranean Fleet, together with Hero and Hereward, participated in the inconclusive Battle of Cape Spartivento on 27 November.

The 9th DF returned to the Western Approaches Command (WAC) from July to September, before they were briefly transferred to Portsmouth Command for several weeks, in response to the possible invasion (Operation Sea Lion). They returned to the WAC before the end of the month and Harvester and Highlander sank  on 30 October. In November 1940, the 9th DF was re-designated as the 9th Escort Group. The Havants remained on escort duty until they began lengthy refits during 1941.

Gallant, Greyhound and Griffin were covering a convoy to Malta on 10 January when the former struck a mine that blew off her bow. Griffin rescued her crew and the ship was towed to Malta. Repairs were estimated to take until June 1942, but she was declared a constructive total loss and stripped of equipment after she had to be beached during an aerial attack on 5 April 1942. On 19 January, Greyhound sank the  after the latter torpedoed one of the ships in the convoy that Greyhound was escorting. Greyhound, Griffin, Hotspur, Hasty, Havock and Hereward participated in the Battle of Cape Matapan on 27–28 March. Greyhound was sunk by German dive bombers two months later, on 22 May, off Crete; Hereward suffered a similar fate a week later. Hotspur, Havock, Hero, and Hasty also participated in the evacuations of Greece and Crete in May. The latter three ships then supported Allied forces during the Syria–Lebanon Campaign in June. All four of the H-class ships, joined by Griffin, began escorting convoys from Alexandria to Tobruk in July, as well as occasional convoys to Malta, and continued to do so for most of the rest of the year. Hasty and Hotspur sank  on 23 December while returning from Tobruk.

Garland and the five surviving Havants spent most of the year on convoy escort duties in the Atlantic aside from brief diversions such as Operation Tiger, a Mediterranean convoy in May that Harvester, Havelock, and Hesperus escorted, and Garlands participation in the Spitzbergen Raid in July. Hurricane was badly damaged by a German bomb in May that took the rest of the year to repair.

Hesperus was transferred to Force H in December 1941 for anti-submarine defence of the Strait of Gibraltar and sank  by ramming on 15 January 1942. In March 1942, the Havant-class destroyers were designated group leaders of the Mid-Ocean Escort Force through the winter of 1942–1943. Garland was assigned to the escort force for Convoy PQ 16 to Murmansk in May, during which she was damaged by a German bomber. After repairs, she rejoined her half-sisters in the North Atlantic. On 26 December, Hesperus sank  by ramming.

Griffin and Hotspur were transferred to the Eastern Fleet in February 1942. Havock, Hasty, and Hero participated in the Second Battle of Sirte on 22 March during which the former was damaged. While under repair at Malta, she was further damaged and was then ordered to Gibraltar for repairs in a safer environment. Whilst in transit, she ran aground off the Tunisian coast during the night of 5/6 April due to a navigational error and had to be destroyed to prevent her capture. To reinforce the escorts for Operation Vigorous, a convoy from Alexandria to Malta in June, Griffin and Hotspur were temporarily recalled to join their sisters. During the mission, Hasty was torpedoed by a German E-boat and had to be scuttled by Hotspur on 15 June. On 30 October, Hero shared the credit for sinking  with five other destroyers and a Vickers Wellesley bomber of No. 42 Squadron RAF. Griffin arrived home that same month to begin her conversion into an escort destroyer. Garland remained in the North Atlantic until December 1943 when she began escorting convoys between Freetown and Gibraltar.

Hotspur and Hero were sent home and converted into escort destroyers in early 1943. Griffin and Hero were transferred to the Royal Canadian Navy in March and November 1943 and renamed Ottawa and Chaudière, respectively. Hotspur began escort duties in the WAC after her conversion was completed that lasted until October 1944. While escorting Convoy HX 228, Harvester rammed  on 10 March, but was disabled in the process, so the French corvette Aconit finished off the submarine. Hesperus continued to escort convoys in the North Atlantic until January 1945 when she was transferred to the UK.

Garland was transferred to the Mediterranean in April 1944 and sank  on 19 September. She began a lengthy refit in November and had barely finished working up when the war ended. Havelock, Ottawa and Chaudière were escorting convoys in the North Atlantic until they were transferred to the UK in preparation for Operation Overlord in May 1944. Chaudière and the escorts of Convoy HX 280 sank  on 6 March.

Ottawa, Chaudière and Hotspur also had lengthy overhauls that began in late 1944; the latter's was completed in March 1945 and she then patrolled the Irish Sea until the end of the war while Ottawa returned to the North Atlantic when her refit was finished in February. Chaudières, however, was still not completed by the end of the war. Highlander struck a small iceberg on 15 April that crushed the underwater portion of her bow and was under repair for the next three months. Havelock and Hesperus, assisted by aircraft from No. 201 Squadron RAF, sank  in the Irish Channel on 30 April.

Postwar
The surviving ships were essentially obsolete and worn-out when the war ended in May. Ottawa made several voyages ferrying Canadian troops  back home before she was paid off in October. The ship was sold for scrap in 1946, but was not actually broken up until 1950. Chaudière was in the worst shape of any of the Canadian destroyers and was paid off in August, although she was not scrapped until 1950 like her sister. Garland transported food and other supplies to Dutch and Belgian towns immediately after the end of the war and was part of the Home Fleet until she was reduced to reserve in August 1946. She was purchased by the Royal Netherlands Navy in November 1947, renamed Marnix, and became a training ship until 1964. Hotspur remained in service until 1948 when she was sold to the Dominican Republic and renamed Trujillo. Renamed Duarte in 1962, the ship was sold for scrap in 1972. Havelock and Hesperus escorted the Norwegian government-in-exile back to Norway in May and then served as a target ship before being broken up in late 1946 and 1947, respectively. Like her sisters, Highlander served as a target ship after her repairs were completed and was scrapped beginning in May 1947.

Notes

References

 
 
 
 
 

 

 
 
 
 

Destroyer classes
 
Battle of the Atlantic
North Atlantic convoys of World War II
Ship classes of the Royal Navy